Jarlath Cloonan (born 1953 in Athenry, County Galway) was the County Galway Senior Hurling Manager, 1994-96.

A former selector, Cloonan played a key role as Athenry won three All-Ireland club titles. He has held all the main officerships within the club.

In late 2009, he was nominated for the position of Galway Hurling Board secretary.

See also

 Eugene Cloonan, Former player with the Galway hurling team.

External links
 http://www.independent.ie/sport/hurling/former-boss-cloonan-in-running-for-top-tribe-job-1956969.html
 http://homepage.eircom.net/~stmarysgaa/archives.htm
 http://www.galwayindependent.com/business/business/hurling-stars-to-open-athenry-subway-/

1953 births
Living people
Athenry hurlers
Hurling managers